Agdistis chardzhouna is a moth of the family Pterophoridae. It is found in Turkmenistan.

The wingspan is about 35 mm. The forewings and hindwings are grey. Adults have been recorded in May.

References

Moths described in 1997
Agdistinae